Kotla Jayasurya Prakasha Reddy (born 18 September 1951) was a member of the 15th Lok Sabha of India. He represented the Kurnool constituency of Andhra Pradesh and is a member of Indian National Congress.

Early life
He was born in Hyderabad to Shyamala Devi and former Chief Minister Kotla Vijaya Bhaskara Reddy. He did his graduation from Nizam College, Hyderabad.

Career
Kotla Surya Prakash Reddy was first elected to the parliament in 1991. He was re-elected as Member of Parliament from Kurnool in 2004 and 2009 for the 14th and 15th LokSabha respectively. He was the Minister of State for Railways in the UPA Government.

Positions held

Reddy has held various official posts:

 28 October 2012 —	Union Minister State, Railways.
 23 September 2009	— Member, Committee on Government Assurances.
 6 September 2010 — Member, Consultative Committee, Ministry of Petroleum & Natural Gas.
 31 August 2009 — Member, Committee on Water Resources.
 21 August 2009 — Member, Indian Council of Agricultural Research (I.C.A.R).
 6 August 2009 — Member, Committee on Estimates.
 2009 — Re-elected to 15th Lok Sabha (3rd term).
 2007 — Member, Committee on Agriculture.
 2004 — Re-elected to 14th Lok Sabha (2nd term).
 1991 — Elected to 10th Lok Sabha.

Personal life
He is married to Kotla Sujatha Reddy and they have a son and two daughters.

References

External links
 official biography

Indian National Congress politicians from Andhra Pradesh
1951 births
Living people
India MPs 2004–2009
Telugu politicians
India MPs 2009–2014
India MPs 1991–1996
Lok Sabha members from Andhra Pradesh
People from Kurnool district
People from Rayalaseema
United Progressive Alliance candidates in the 2014 Indian general election